Ronald Carl Mittelhammer (born c. 1950) is an American economist at Washington State University. He received his Ph.D. from the Washington State University in 1978, with specialisms in econometrics and marketing. In 2008 he commenced consecutive three-year terms as President-Elect, President, and Past-President of the American Agricultural Economics Association.

Bibliography

External links 
 Profile at Washington State University official website
 

1950s births
Living people
Washington State University alumni
Washington State University faculty
People from Pullman, Washington
Economists from Washington (state)
21st-century American economists